Storm is the seventh album by classical and pop musician Vanessa-Mae. It was released in the UK on her 19th birthday, 27 October 1997.

Track listing
 "Summer Haze"                                                                                                       3:11
 "Storm" (cover of Antonio Vivaldi: The Four Seasons - "Summer: III. Presto") 3:43
 "Retro"                                                                                                             3:57
 "Bach Street Prelude"                                                                                               4:25
 "Leyenda"                                                                                                           6:32
 "(I) Can, Can (You?)"                                                                                               3:40
 "Happy Valley"                                                                                                      6:32
 "A Poet's Quest (For a Distant Paradise)"                                                                           4:31
 "Embrasse Moi (You Fly Me Up)"                                                                                      5:03
 "Aurora"                                                                                                            4:56
 "I'm a Doun"                                                                                                        4:28
 "I Feel Love" (cover of Donna Summer)                                                                       6:57
 "Hocus Pocus" (cover of Focus)                                                                     3:14
 "The Blessed Spirits"                                                                                               8:16

Charts

Sales and certifications

References

   

Vanessa-Mae albums
1997 albums
EMI Records albums
Classical crossover albums